An Thới may refer to several places in Vietnam, including:

, a ward of Bình Thủy District
An Thới, Kiên Giang, a township of Phú Quốc
An Thoi Naval Base, in An Thới, Kiên Giang
, a rural commune of Mỏ Cày Nam District.